Mount Hicks can refer to these mountains:
 Mount Hicks (Antarctica)
 Mount Hicks (New Zealand), 3216 m
 Mount Hicks (Nevada), United States, 2857 m
 Lower Mount Hicks, Tasmania, Australia, 88 m

Places
 Mount Hicks, Tasmania, a locality in Tasmania, Australia